Junebug is a 2005 American comedy-drama film directed by Phil Morrison. Amy Adams received an Academy Award nomination for her supporting role in the film.

Plot
When art dealer Madeleine travels from Chicago to North Carolina to pursue a local, self-taught painter for her outsider art gallery, she takes the opportunity to meet and stay with the family of her new husband George, who live close by.

There is his mother Peg; his reserved, contemplative father Eugene; and his sullen, resentful, twenty-something brother Johnny, who, although married, lives at home. He is studying for his high school equivalency certificate while working at Replacements, Ltd. as an order processor. Johnny married his now pregnant wife Ashley before either of them finished high school. Relations between Johnny and Ashley are strained, with Ashley believing that a baby will solve their marital problems.

Madeleine and George stay in the expected baby's nursery, and Madeleine becomes friends with Ashley, who is very sweet and friendly, if somewhat naive and talkative. The family takes Madeleine to a church social, where George is asked to sing a hymn. Madeleine is not used to intense religious displays but makes no comment. She attends Ashley's baby shower and gives her sister-in-law an antique silver spoon, which stands out from the other gifts. Madeleine discovers that she does not know much about George, as they have been married only six months and knew each other only a week prior to the union.

The artist Madeleine is pursuing wavers over signing with her gallery. Ashley goes into labor, and the family goes to the hospital with her. Madeleine chooses to go and convince the artist to sign with her gallery, which briefly makes George angry. Madeleine calls George to rave about the artist (she is impressed with his work, but shocked by his anti-Semitism) without asking about the baby.  George interrupts her and informs her that Ashley's baby boy is stillborn, which causes Madeleine to double over with guilt. The artist and his sister drive Madeleine back to her in-laws' home, and she later sits with Eugene on the back porch and cries. Meanwhile, George supports Ashley at the hospital, who expresses that George is always there when Ashley needs him. George kisses Ashley on the forehead and leaves. George comes home and has a wordless encounter in the garage with his brother, Johnny, who throws a tool at him, injuring his forehead. George does nothing in response.

The next day, George and Madeleine prepare to leave. Johnny calls Ashley and suggests that they "try again," to which Ashley excitedly squeals. As George and Madeleine drive onto the highway and pick up speed, George remarks, "I'm so glad we're out of there" as Madeleine caresses George's neck with her left hand.

Cast

Production 
The film was shot on Super 16mm film stock.

Reception 
The film premiered at the 2005 Sundance Film Festival, where Adams won a Special Jury Prize for her performance. On review aggregator website Rotten Tomatoes, Junebug has an approval rating of 86% based on 135 reviews, and an average rating of 7.50/10. The website's critical consensus states, "Aided and abetted by a wonderful cast, director Phil Morrison transforms familiar material into an understated and resonant comedy". Metacritic assigned the film a weighted average score of 80 out of 100, based on 34 critics, indicating "generally favorable reviews".

Roger Ebert gave the film four stars and praised it as "a movie that understands, profoundly and with love and sadness, the world of small towns; it captures ways of talking and living I remember from my childhood, with the complexity and precision of great fiction". Tim Robey of The Daily Telegraph labeled the film a "rare treat" and a "small, quiet miracle". There was particular praise for Amy Adams, who went on to earn her first of six Academy Award nominations.

Music
The film's score is made up of original music by Yo La Tengo, as well as classical music by Haydn, Shostakovich, Schubert and Vivaldi. The film begins and ends with the 1977 song "Harmour Love" performed by Syreeta Wright and written by Stevie Wonder. During a scene where most of the characters are at a church social, George and two young men are featured singing the hymn "Softly and Tenderly, Jesus Is Calling" by Will Lamartine Thompson.

In 2008, Yo La Tengo released some of the original music in a compilation of their soundtrack work titled They Shoot, We Score.

Home media
The DVD was released on January 17, 2006, by Sony Pictures Entertainment. The release includes deleted scenes, audio commentary with Embeth Davidtz and Amy Adams, behind-the-scenes featurettes, and casting sessions.

Awards

Footnotes

References

External links

 
 
 
 

2005 comedy-drama films
2005 films
American comedy-drama films
American independent films
Films about dysfunctional families
Films set in North Carolina
Films shot in North Carolina
American pregnancy films
Sony Pictures Classics films
2005 independent films
Films shot in 16 mm film
2000s English-language films
2000s American films
2000s pregnancy films